Robert Ronald Jensen (born 6 April 1949) is an American mathematician, specializing in nonlinear partial differential equations with applications to physics, engineering, game theory, and finance.

Jensen graduated in 1971 with B.S. in mathematics from Illinois Institute of Technology. He received in 1975 his Ph.D. from Northwestern University with thesis Finite difference approximation to the free boundary of a parabolic variational inequality under the supervision of Avner Friedman. Jensen was from 1975 to 1977 an assistant professor at the University of California, Los Angeles and from 1977 to 1980 a visiting assistant professor at the University of Wisconsin's Mathematics Research Center. At the University of Kentucky he was from 1977 to 1980 an assistant professor and from 1980 to 1987 an associate professor. At Loyola University Chicago he was from 1985 to 1986 a visiting associate professor and is since 1986 a full professor. At Loyola he was from 2007 to 2012 the chair of the department of mathematics and statistics.

From 1982 to 1986 Jensen held a Sloan Fellowship. He was a visiting member of Berkeley's Mathematical Sciences Research Institute in 1992, 2005, and 2013. He has given invited talks at universities and conferences around the world. In 1998 he was an Invited Speaker at the International Congress of Mathematicians in Berlin.

Selected publications

References

External links
 

1949 births
Living people
Illinois Institute of Technology alumni
Northwestern University alumni
University of Kentucky faculty
Loyola University Chicago faculty
20th-century American mathematicians
21st-century American mathematicians
PDE theorists
Fellows of the American Mathematical Society